Henrietta Sara Louise Baynes (born 16 August 1956) is an English film, television and theatre actress. She began her career in ballet by training from the age of 10 at the Royal Ballet School and made her professional debut, at the age of 12, in Rudolf Nureyev's The Nutcracker followed by The Sleeping Beauty at the Royal Opera House, Covent Garden. In her mid-teens she moved from dance to acting.

She began her acting career at 17, as an acting ASM in repertory theatre. She was married to film director Ken Russell from 1992 to 1999; they had one son.

Early life and education
Baynes was born in Boscombe Hospital, Bournemouth, the daughter of aeronautical engineer Leslie Baynes, who designed what is believed to be the oldest flying glider in the United Kingdom, and Margot (née Findlay). Baynes attended the Elmhurst Ballet School in Camberley in Surrey, where a contemporary was the actress Laura Hartong.   Hetty graduated with a Creative Writing MA in 2015 from Birkbeck College London University, where she also took a BA in Philosophy in the late 1980s.

Career

Acting career
Her stage career has involved many roles: in 1979 in John Osborne's Inadmissible Evidence at the Royal Court Theatre, and in 1984, a comic performance alongside Maureen Lipman and Lionel Jeffries in the Theatre of Comedy’s See How They Run. In 1991, she appeared with Edward Fox, in The Philanthropist at Wyndham's Theatre and in 1997, she appeared as Lady Fidget in William Wycherley's The Country Wife . Her most recent stage performance was in 2004, as Shirley in Revelations by Stephen Lowe at the Hampstead Theatre.

During her career she has received three best actress nominations for her performances: in 1991, as Rita in Henrik Ibsen's Little Eyolf (Off-West End Awards), in 1992, as Maddy in Michael Wall's Women Laughing (Manchester Evening News Awards) and as Marilyn Monroe in Marilyn Bowering's Anyone Can See I Love You (Sony and Prix Italia Awards).

Baynes has also appeared on television including, in 1981, Agatha Christie's The Seven Dials Mystery, in 1985, with Pauline Collins and Michael Gambon in The Tropical Moon Over Dorking, in 1990, as the wife of Stephen Fry in Simon Gray's Old Flames, in 1993, as Hilda in Ken Russell's Lady Chatterley’s Lover and in The Secret Life of Sir Arnold Bax. She appeared as Vera Rowley in the BBC series The Hour in 2011, and was also in BBC1's The Casual Vacancy in 2015.

Art and paintings
She studied a fine art BA degree at Central St Martins. She had an exhibition at the Strand Gallery, London entitled Betsy and Blapsy.

Personal life
She was married to film director Ken Russell from 1992 to 1999; their son, Rex, was born on 7 January 1993 and is a film director.

Selected theatre appearances
 The Country Wife (Plymouth & tour)
 The Heidi Chronicles
 The Passing Out Parade
 The Admirable Crichton (Greenwich Theatre)
 Women Laughing - Best Actress nomination for the Manchester Evening News Awards (Manchester Royal Exchange)
 The Philanthropist (Wyndham Theatre)
 Little Eyolf - Best Actress nomination for the Fringe Awards (Bird's Nest)
 Hand Over Fist (Watermill)
 See How They Run
 Theatre of Comedy (Shaftesbury Theatre)
 Buglar Boy (Traverse Theatre, Edinburgh Festival)
 Happy Event
 The Reluctante Debutant
 Hay Fever (Windsor)
 Le Bourgeois Gentilhomme (Lyric, Belfast)
 Chorus Girls (Stratford East)
 Suddenly Last Summer
 Three Sisters (Thorndike Theatre)
 Inadmissible Evidence (Royal Court)
 Othello (Ludlow Festival) and
 The Merry Wives of Windsor
 On the Rocks (Mermaid Theatre).

Selected television appearances

Doctors (2020) as Yvonne Wrigley
Father Brown (2017) as Lucia Morell, episode 5.5 "The Hand of Lucia"
 Secret Army
 My Family
 Cutting It
 Cor Blimey
 The Bill - A Time to Kill
 Jonathan Creek - Miracle in Crooked Lane
 A Touch of Frost - Keys to the Car
 Ken Russell’s Treasure Island
 The Vet
 Fall of Eagles
 Alice in Russialand
 Privateer 2 : The Darkening
 The Secret Life of Sir Arnold Bax
 Minder 
 Old Flames
 Christmas Present
 London's Burning
 Harry’s Kingdom
 Bergerac
 The Piglet Files
 Drummonds
 Tropical Moon Over Dorking
 Wynne & Penkovsky
 Chance in a Million
 Dickens of London
 Running Scared
 Charters & Caldicott
 Marjorie and Men
 Crime Writers
 Just William
 Good Companions
 Winter Sunlight
 Agatha Christie's The Seven Dials Mystery
 Dombey and Son
 Sense and Sensibility
 Nicholas Nickleby
 Benefit of the Doubt
 The Last Song
 Hunchback of Notre Dame
 Renoir My Father
 Red Dwarf - Dimension Jump
 Footballers' Wives
 The Hour
 The Casual Vacancy
 Rumpole of the Bailey: Series 2, Episode 3, "Rumpole and the Show Folk" (first aired 12 June 1979), under the name Henrieta Baynes, as Christine Hope
 Keep It in the Family: Series 3, Episode 1, "Splitting Headaches" (first aired 1 September 1981), under the name Henrieta Baynes, as a secretary

Selected radio performances
 Far from the Madding Crowd  (4 May – 8 June 1990)
 Rumpole and the Vanishing Juror (8 October 2003)
 Tim Merryman’s Days of Clover
 John Naismith's A Memory Longer Than Death
 Suzy in BBC Radio 4's drama series Citizens (1987–92)

Selected film appearances
The Balance of Nature (1983) as Blanche
 Coping with Cupid
 The Insatiable Mrs Kirsch (which she co-wrote with Ken Russell)
 Mindbender, The Life of Uri Geller
 Herbert Ross's Nijinsky
 Ken Russell's Lady Chatterley
 Blanche Dumas from B to Z

References

External links 
 

1956 births
Living people
People educated at the Royal Ballet School
English film actresses
English television actresses
English stage actresses
English voice actresses
Actresses from Dorset
Alumni of Birkbeck, University of London
Actors from Bournemouth
20th-century English actresses
21st-century English actresses